The 2012–13 Scottish Youth Cup was the 30th season of the Scottish Youth Cup, the national knockout tournament at youth level organised by the Scottish Football Association for its full and associate member clubs. The tournament is now for the under-20 age group to complement current youth development strategies, having formerly been an under-19 competition.

Celtic won the competition for the fourth year in succession, defeating Dunfermline Athletic, 3–1 in the final at Hampden Park.

Calendar
The final of the competition was brought forward by one day to 1 May 2013 after a request by Dunfermline Athletic, as a number of their youth squad had stepped up to the first-team after the club entered administration.

Format
The sixteen clubs who reached the Fourth round of the 2011–12 competition receive a bye to the third round of this season's tournament. The remaining thirty four clubs enter the first round and are initially divided into three regional groups to reduce travelling. The tournament becomes an all-in national competition from the third round onwards.

First round
The draws for the First and Second Rounds were conducted on 31 July 2012.

Central Group

Three ties were drawn in this group with the following clubs receiving a bye to the second round:

Alloa Athletic
Arbroath
Berwick Rangers
Cowdenbeath
Dumbarton
East Fife
Edinburgh City
Heart of Midlothian
Motherwell
Partick Thistle
Preston Athletic
Queen's Park
Raith Rovers
Spartans
Stirling Albion

North Group

No First Round ties were drawn in this group with all the following clubs receiving byes to the Second round.
Brora Rangers
Clachnacuddin
Cove Rangers
Formartine United
Fort William
Fraserburgh,
Huntly
Ross County

South Group

No First Round ties were drawn in this group with all the following clubs receiving byes to the Second round.
Annan Athletic
Gala Fairydean
Kilmarnock
Stranraer
Threave Rovers

Second round
The second round ties are due to be played on or around 23 September 2012.

Central Group

North Group

South Group

Gala Fairydean receive a bye to the third round.

Third round
The following sixteen clubs enter at this stage by virtue of having reached the fourth round of last season's competition:

Aberdeen
Airdrie United
Ayr United
Celtic
Dundee United
Dunfermline Athletic
Falkirk
Greenock Morton
Hamilton Academical
Hibernian
Inverness Caledonian Thistle
Livingston
Montrose
Queen of the South
St Mirren
Stenhousemuir

The third round draw took place on 25 September 2012 at Hampden Park, Glasgow.

Annan Athletic were expelled from the tournament due to player registration errors.

Fourth round
The fourth round draw was conducted on 23 October 2012.

Quarter-finals
The Quarter-final draw was conducted on 27 November 2012.

Semi-finals
The semi-final draw was conducted at Hampden Park on 27 November 2012.

Final

External links
Youth Cup on Scottish FA website

References

5
Scottish Youth Cup seasons